The Lost Notebooks of Leonardo da Vinci is a 1995 role-playing game supplement published by R. Talsorian Games for Castle Falkenstein.

Contents
The Lost Notebooks of Leonardo da Vinci is a sourcebook about magickal engines.

Reviews
Dragon #234
Shadis #26 (April, 1996)
Rollespilsmagasinet Fønix (Danish) (Issue 12 - Mar/Apr 1996)

References

Castle Falkenstein (role-playing game) supplements
Role-playing game supplements introduced in 1995